Herbert Geer was an Australian  commercial law firm with offices located in Melbourne, Sydney and Brisbane.

History
The law firm of Herbert Geer was founded on 26 January 1939 when Keith Geer commenced his sole practice in Bank Place, off Collins Street, Melbourne.  After the disruption of the Second World War, Keith Geer resumed his practice and was joined in 1946 by Geoffrey Herbert, who continued to operate from his office in Black Rock.

The firm was known as Herbert & Geer and was largely a conveyancing practice. In 1950 the partnership expanded further with the addition of Eric Rundle and in 1960 it assumed the name, Herbert Geer & Rundle. In 1962 the Melbourne office relocated to 113 William Street, taking with it a total of ten partners and staff and three residents in the office at Black Rock. At about this time the firm purchased an office in Niddrie at the request of the Bank of New South Wales, for professional expansion in this area. This office was sold in 1988. Between 1962 and 1970, three small practices were absorbed into Herbert Geer & Rundle; Farmer & Ramsay, Williams & Matthews and the office of Cyril Brooks. Many clients from these three firms are still associated with the firm today.

The firm achieved publicity in the early 1970s by handling the defendant’s litigation for all workers' compensation claims arising from the Westgate bridge collapse. Further office relocations occurred with moves to Owen Dixon Chambers and BHP House before arriving at the State Bank Building in 1983. At that time the firm comprised 35 persons and was well known for its strong commercial practice focusing on tax. The prominent partners were then Leon Gorr, David Geer and Tom May.

In July 1985 the firm took the pivotal step of acquiring an insurance litigation practice of 11 persons led by Richard Mole. By 1989 Herbert Geer & Rundle had one of the largest insurance practices in Victoria. The firm had 12 partners and 110 staff. 

The commercial lawyer Greg Basser joined the firm and developed a large and strong practice. The decade commencing in 1990 was considered to be the halcyon period for the firm. Many concluded that in financial terms the firm was the most profitable in Australia.

In April 1999, Richard Mole for the firm opened a Sydney office and expanded to Brisbane in early 2001.

Some key partners, including Basser, left the firm early in the next decade but it was in 2006 when Herbert Geer & Rundle suffered near fatal wounds. Five litigation partners, including Richard Mole left the firm. Further, David Geer retired and Andrew Newbold resigned.

In 2008 the firm rebranded as Herbert Geer and, in the absence of organic growth, sought mergers. It joined with Brisbane firm Nicol Robinson Halletts Lawyers, as well as the boutique construction firm RDK in Sydney.

Herbert Geer acted for iiNet Limited, an Australian ISP, in its defence of a landmark Federal Court claim and subsequent appeal brought by a group of major film studios alleging that iiNet had authorised copyright infringements by its subscribers, and in successfully arguing the matter of Kirk v Industrial Relations Commission in the High Court.

In 2014, Herbert Geer merged with Thomsons Lawyers to form Thomson Geer.

External links
 Official website

References 

Law firms of Australia
Organizations established in 1939
1939 establishments in Australia
Australian companies established in 1939